The Germany men's national volleyball team represents Germany in international volleyball competitions. It is governed by the German Volleyball Association. Germany won the gold medal at the 1970 World Championship as East Germany and the bronze medal at the 2014 World Championship.

After German reunification, West Germany (1949–1990) was renamed Germany and they absorbed East Germany (1949–1990) with the records. Since 1992 they have appeared at the Olympic Games on two occasions, finishing with a ninth place at Beijing 2008 and a fifth place at London 2012. However, Germany have enjoyed some recent success on the continental stage, winning gold at the 2015 European Games and silver at the 2017 European Championship.
Before reunification, East Germany finished fourth at Mexico City 1968, before winning the silver medal at Munich 1972. East Germany were also crowned FIVB World Champions in 1970 and clinched the FIVB World Cup in 1969.

Results

By West Germany national team, East Germany national team and Germany national team

Summer Olympics

 Champions   Runners up   Third place   Fourth place

World Championship

 Champions   Runners up   Third place   Fourth place

World Cup

 Champions   Runners up   Third place   Fourth place

World League

 Champions   Runners up   Third place   Fourth place

Nations League

 Champions   Runners up   Third place   Fourth place

European Games

 Champions   Runners up   Third place   Fourth place

European Championship

 Champions   Runners up   Third place   Fourth place

European League

 Champions   Runners up   Third place   Fourth place

Team

Current squad
The following is the German roster in the 2022 FIVB Volleyball Men's World Championship.

Head coach:  Michał Winiarski

Coaches history

Kit providers
The table below shows the history of kit providers for the Germany national volleyball team.

Sponsorship
Primary sponsors include: main sponsors like Comdirect Bank other sponsors: ERGO Group, German Sports Aid Foundation and Deutsche Energie.

Notes

References

External links
Official website
FIVB profile

Volleyball
Volleyball in Germany
National men's volleyball teams
Men's sport in Germany